Broxton railway station was a railway station near the village of Broxton, Cheshire on the Whitchurch and Tattenhall Railway.

History
Broxton opened on 1 October 1872. It had a station building and two side platforms. It was located behind the Edgerton Arms Hotel on the A41.

The station closed on 16 September 1957. The site is now the Broxton Picnic Area.

Services

Further reading

References

External links
 Broxton station on Subterranea Britannica

Disused railway stations in Cheshire
Former London and North Western Railway stations
Railway stations in Great Britain opened in 1872
Railway stations in Great Britain closed in 1957
1872 establishments in England
1957 disestablishments in England